Jasamine Freckel's Love Affair is a 1921 short Australian silent film directed by P. J. Ramster. The film imitated Mack Sennett's Bathing Beauties comedies.

It is considered a lost film.

Cast
Nancy Simpson		
Annie Parsons		
Elsa Granger		
Lydia Rich		
Fred Oppey		
Anthony Aroney

References

External links

Jasamine Freckel's Love Affair at National Film and Sound Archive

1921 films
Australian drama films
Australian silent short films
Australian black-and-white films
1921 drama films
Lost Australian films
1921 lost films
Lost drama films
Silent drama films